The Tsingtauer Neueste Nachrichten (Tsingtau Sin Pau) was a German-language newspaper published in Qingdao from 1904 to 1914. Fritz Seeker was the editor.

The newspaper served the locals in Qingdao and various German companies in the Far East. The newspaper reported on the management of the Kiautschou Bay concession, activity of Western powers in East Asia, and the methods and trades of Christian missionaries. When World War I broke out, the Japanese took over Qingdao and the publishing of German newspapers ended.

See also

Der Ostasiatische Lloyd
Deutsche Shanghai Zeitung

References
 Kim, Chun-shik. Deutscher Kulturimperialismus in China: Deutsches Kolonialschulwesen in Kiautschou(China) 1898-1914. Franz Steiner Verlag, 2004. , 9783515085700.
 Miscellaneous series, Issues 7-11. United States Department of Commerce, Bureau of Foreign and Domestic Commerce, 1912.
 Walravens, Hartmut. "German Influence on the Press in China." - In: Newspapers in International Librarianship: Papers Presented by the Newspaper Section at IFLA General Conferences. Walter de Gruyter, January 1, 2003. , 9783110962796.
Also available at (Archive) the website of the Queens Library - This version does not include the footnotes visible in the Walter de Gruyter version
Also available in Walravens, Hartmut and Edmund King. Newspapers in international librarianship: papers presented by the newspapers section at IFLA General Conferences. K.G. Saur, 2003. , 9783598218378.

Notes

Further reading
 Kreissler, François. L'Action culturelle allemande en Chine: de la fin du XIXe siècle à la Seconde guerre mondiale. Les Editions de la MSH (FR), 1989. , 9782735102778. - "Tsingtauer Neueste Nachrichten" mentioned in pages 73, 86-88

External links
 Tsingtauer Neueste Nachrichten, Berlin State Library
 Zeitung "Tsingtauer Neueste Nachrichten" - Deutsche Digitale Bibliothek

Defunct newspapers published in China
German-language newspapers published in China
Mass media in Qingdao
Publications disestablished in 1914
Publications established in 1904
1904 establishments in China
1914 disestablishments in China